DBM or dbm may refer to:

Science and technology
 dBm, a unit for power measurement
 DBM (computing), family of key-value database engines including dbm, ndbm, gdbm, and Berkeley DB
 Database Manager (DBM), a component of 1987's Extended Edition v1.0 release of IBM's OS/2 operating system
 Dibenzoylmethane, an aromatic diketone: 1,3-diphenylpropane-1,3-dione
 Dibromomethane, a halomethane
 Difference bound matrix, a data structure used in a field of computer science
 Dibutyl maleate, an organic chemical compound

Other uses
 D. B. M. Patnaik (1925–2009), Indian lawyer, politician and communist leader
 De Bellis Multitudinis, a wargame ruleset
 Department of Budget and Management, the executive department in the Philippines
 D-flat minor, a theoretical musical key